South Wales Transport was a bus company that operated services in South Wales centred on Swansea and West Wales.

History

South Wales Transport commenced operating on 2 May 1914 in Swansea. It operated bus services that connected with the Swansea Improvements and Tramway Company. It was owned by British Electric Traction. In 1937, buses replaced the trams.

In 1958, South Wales Transport bought the Swansea and Mumbles Railway which was an electric tram service between Swansea and Mumbles which closed in 1960.

On 1 January 1969, it became part of the National Bus Company. In May 1987, during the privatisation of the National Bus Company, South Wales Transport was sold to a management buy out. It was resold to Badgerline in 1990. It was included in the 16 June 1995 merger of Badgerline with GRT Group to form FirstBus and became part of First Cymru in April 1998.

South Wales Transport (Neath) Limited
The South Wales Transport name has been revived by a bus operator in Neath.

References

Former bus operators in Wales
1914 establishments in Wales
British companies established in 1914
Transport companies established in 1914